The Baby Cyclone is a lost 1928 American comedy silent film directed by A. Edward Sutherland and based upon the 1927 play by George M. Cohan, adapted for the screen by F. Hugh Herbert and Robert E. Hopkins. The film stars Lew Cody, Aileen Pringle, Robert Armstrong, Gwen Lee and Nora Cecil. The film was released on September 27, 1928, by Metro-Goldwyn-Mayer.

Plot
 
Jessie Hurley (Gwen Lee) becomes infatuated with her new Pekingese.  This makes her husband Gene Hurley (Robert Armstrong) jealous.  While out walking the dog, he sells it to society girl Lydia Webster (Aileen Pringle).  He tells Jessie the dog got lost, but Jessie learns the truth and takes it back.  Lydia and her fiancé, Joe Meadows (Lew Cody), try to regain custody.  Eventually, all four humans are arrested on charges of dog stealing and inciting a riot. The film featured "a near deadly duel with an electric light bulb and a bottle of catsup as the main constituents."

Cast 
Lew Cody as Joe Meadows
Aileen Pringle as Lydia
Robert Armstrong as Gene
Gwen Lee as Jessie
Nora Cecil as Mrs. Crandall
Fred Esmelton as Mr. Webster
Clarissa Selwynne as Mrs. Webster
Wade Boteler as Bill

References

External links 
 

1928 films
1920s English-language films
Silent American comedy films
1928 comedy films
Metro-Goldwyn-Mayer films
Films directed by A. Edward Sutherland
American black-and-white films
American silent feature films
Lost American films
1928 lost films
Lost comedy films
Films with screenplays by F. Hugh Herbert
1920s American films